The MV Korean Star was a bulk carrier, built in 1984, that was wrecked on 20 May 1988 near Cape Cuvier, Western Australia.

Fate
The Korean Star sailed from Hong Kong on 11 May 1988 in ballast with 19 crew aboard, en route to load salt from Lake MacLeod. While anchored off Cape Cuvier, she dragged her anchors as a result of cyclonic weather conditions associated with Cyclone Herbie and was wrecked on 20 May 1988.

The vessel was declared a constructive total loss after it broke in two shortly after grounding.

See also
List of shipwrecks in 1988

References

External links
 MV Korean Star (+1988) at www.wrecksite.eu

1984 ships
Maritime incidents in 1988
Shipwrecks of Western Australia